Daphne erosiloba is a shrub, of the family Thymelaeaceae.  It is native to China, specifically Western Sichuan.

Description
The shrub is deciduous, and grows from 0.5 to 1.0 meters tall. Its branches are slender and dense, but do not bear fruit. It is often found in sunny herbaceous slopes at around 3200–3800 meters in altitude.

References

erosiloba